The Porcupine Mountains Ski Area, also known as Ski the Porkies is a ski area located in the Porcupine Mountains State Park in Carp Lake Township near Silver City, Michigan, United States. Clearing of the area began on October 18, 1940, on Weather Horn Peak and finished by January 11, 1941. After being abandoned during World War II it was reopened in December 1949.

References

External links 
 

Ski areas and resorts in Michigan
Mountains of Michigan